Luis Maria Heyden (27 November 1893 – 9 December 1951) was a German tennis player. He competed in two events at the 1912 Summer Olympics.

References

1893 births
1951 deaths
German male tennis players
Olympic tennis players of Germany
Tennis players at the 1912 Summer Olympics
People from Carabobo